Al-Mansur Muhammad (1441 – March 4, 1505) was an imam of the Zaidi state in Yemen who ruled in 1475–1504, in rivalry with other claimants for the imamate.

Zaidi disunity

Muhammad bin Ali as-Siraji al-Washali was one of the three Sayyids who claimed the Yemeni imamate after the death of al-Mutawakkil al-Mutahhar in Dhamar in 1474. He was a seventh-generation descendant of the imam Yahya bin Muhammad as-Siraji (d. 1296). He took the honorific title al-Mansur Muhammad. The two other claimants were al-Hadi Izz ad-din (d. 1495) and an-Nasir Muhammad (d. 1488). A fourth imam, al-Mu’ayyad Muhammad posed as lord of San'a (Sahib San'a) since 1464. Al-Mansur Muhammad was thus only one of several leaders in the Zaidi lands of highland Yemen. At this time, the Sunni Tahiride dynasty ruled from Zabid and Ta'izz in the lowland and southern highland. The Tahiride sultans did not attempt to expand to the north after 1465, and their relations to the Zaidi imams oscillated between tolerance and enmity. A preserved text outlines the political situation in the Zaidi territory around 1500. Al-Mu'ayyad Muhammad ruled San'a and the surrounding districts; the Kawkaban area stood under the sons of the old imam al-Mutawakkil al-Mutahhar; and the traditional Zaidi centre Sa'dah and its districts were divided between al-Mansur Muhammad and two other families.

Defeats against the Tahirides

Al-Mansur Muhammad attacked Tahiride positions between Dhamar and San'a in 1496 and 1498. On the latter occasion the imam's forces were completely routed. After the death of al-Mu'ayyad Muhammad bin an-Nasir in 1503, San'a was dominated by a certain Sharib. In the next year, the Tahiride Sultan Amir attacked the city. Al-Mansur Muhammad hastened down to relieve the defenders of San'a, but he fell in the hands of Sultan Amir. The Tahirides entered San'a and a reign of terror ensued. The captured imam was poisoned in prison in San'a three months later. The Tahiride triumph was just temporary. Two years later the Zaidi imamate was continued in the person of al-Mutawakkil Yahya Sharaf ad-Din, who managed to unite large parts of Yemen under his authority.

See also

 Imams of Yemen
 Rassids
 History of Yemen

References

Zaydi imams of Yemen
1505 deaths
1441 births
15th century in Yemen
16th century in Yemen
15th-century Arabs